Griffin Layne is an American country music singer and songwriter.

Layne's debut single,"Nothin like a Southern Girl", has been added to the Most Popular Urban Cowboy Music Tracks Chart, by 93.5 FM. Layne co-wrote and produced his debut single, "Nothin like a Southern Girl", which was released on January 23, 2016 on Equus Records.

Griffin won four awards for his work, including Artist of the Year at the Los Angeles Music Awards in 2007, Producers Choice Award at the Los Angeles Music Awards in 2008, Best Country Artist and Best Country Song at the IMC Awards in 2015.

Griffin has cited some of his musical influencers, such as Dave Grohl.

References

External links
Review: Country singer Griffin Layne delivers on new song 'Won't Let Go'
Tree Planted for Griffin Layne in honor of his contributions to the Buenas Cosas community outreach program

Country musicians from Ohio
American country singer-songwriters
Year of birth uncertain
Living people
Music of Ohio
Singer-songwriters from Ohio
21st-century American singers
Year of birth missing (living people)